Millersport Jr./Sr. High School is a public high school in Millersport, Ohio, United States.  It is the only high school in the Walnut Township Local School District.  The school's nickname is the Lakers.

Notable alumni
 Roman Atwood (2001) – YouTube prankster

Eastland-Fairfield Career & Technical School

Notes and references

External links
School website

High schools in Fairfield County, Ohio
Public high schools in Ohio